Wyoming's 16th State Senate district is one of 30 districts in the Wyoming Senate. It has been represented by Republican Senator Dan Dockstader, Dockstader has been the President of the Senate since 2021.

List of members representing the district

Recent election results

Federal and statewide results

2008

2012

2016

2020

References

External links

Wyoming Senate districts